Flounders are a group of several species of flatfish. Flounder is also a verb meaning to act clumsily.

Flounder may also refer to:

 Flounder, a character in the film The Little Mermaid
 The Flounder (also known as Der Butt), a 1977 novel by Günter Grass
 USS Flounder, a United States Navy submarine
 Nexus 9, a tablet computer codenamed Flounder
 Xi'an JH-7, a Chinese fighter-bomber with NATO reporting name Flounder

See also
 Floundering, a 1994 film
 Founder